The Civil Air Navigation Services Organisation (CANSO) is a representative body of companies that provide air traffic control. It represents the interests of Air Navigation Service Providers (ANSPs). CANSO members are responsible for supporting over 85% of world air traffic, and through its workgroups, members share information and develop new policies, with the aim of improving air navigation services on the ground and in the air. CANSO also represents its members' views in regulatory and industry forums, including at the International Civil Aviation Organization (ICAO), where it has official Observer status.

Full membership is open to all ANSPs regardless of their legal status. This includes ANSPs who are integrated within government structures and departments. Members who are not separated from their governments are able to sign an article of membership which explicitly recognises that CANSO does not represent the national government of the ANSP's home state in any way.

The Associate Membership of CANSO is drawn from companies and organisations from the aviation industry who are involved with the delivery of air traffic services. Membership offers them the chance to network both formally and informally with clients, and decision makers across the aviation industry. Associate Members may contribute to CANSO's work programmes and help it improve the delivery of Air Navigation Services.

CANSO is member of the Air Transport Action Group (ATAG).

Full members

See also
 List of air navigation service providers

External links
 CANSO members
 CANSO Work Programmes
 Official website of the Civil Air Navigation Services Organisation (CANSO)

Air traffic control organizations
International air transport
International aviation organizations